"777 (We Can Sing a Song!)" (stylized "777 ～We can sing a song!～") is a song by Japanese pop group AAA. It is their 33rd single and is included in the group's seventh studio album 777: Triple Seven. The song was written by Mitsuhiro Hidaka and Leonn. The single was released in Japan on July 25, 2012, under Avex Trax in three editions: a CD-only edition, a CD and DVD edition, and a Mu-Mo edition. "777 (We Can Sing a Song!)" debuted at number four on the weekly Oricon singles chart. The single has charted for two weeks and went on to sell over  39,400 copies in Japan.

Composition
"777 (We Can Sing a Song!)" was written by Mitsuhiro Hidaka and Leonn, composed by Hirofumi Hibino, and arranged by Blue Birds. "Birthday Song" was written by Kenn Kato, and composed by Jam9 and ArmySlick.

Release and promotion
"777 (We Can Sing a Song!)" was released on July 25, 2012, in three editions: a CD-only edition; a CD and DVD edition, which includes the music video for the song and the music video making; a Mu-Mo edition, which includes the Think About AAA 6th Anniversary clips from season 21. The song was used in television advertisements for hypermarket Ito-Yokado's "Cool Magic" and "Koi Yukata" ads.

Chart performance
"777 (We Can Sing a Song!)" debuted at number four on the weekly Oricon singles charts, selling 35,806 copies in its first week. It has charted for two weeks and sold over 39,400 copies in Japan. On the issue dated August 6, 2012, the song debuted at number eight on the Billboard Japan Hot 100.

Track listing

Chart history

Notes
  The sales figure of 39,400 copies is taken from accumulating the sales of the single during its first two charting weeks on the Oricon weekly chart (35,806, 3,640).

References

2012 singles
AAA (band) songs
Avex Trax singles
Japanese-language songs
2012 songs
Songs written by Mitsuhiro Hidaka